The Gardens, Great Ashfield is a  biological Site of Special Scientific Interest north of Great Ashfield in Suffolk.

These ancient meadows are traditionally managed by grazing and cutting for hay. They have a rich variety of flora, such as green-winged orchid, bee orchid, common twayblade, pepper saxifrage, adder's tongue fern and ox-eye daisy.

The site is private land with no public access.

References

Sites of Special Scientific Interest in Suffolk